Martin Schmidt (born 22 December 1969) is a German male handball player. He was a member of the Germany men's national handball team. He was part of the  team at the 1996 Summer Olympics, playing three matches. On club level he played for THW Kiel in Kiel.

References

1969 births
Living people
German male handball players
Handball players at the 1996 Summer Olympics
Olympic handball players of Germany
People from Verden (district)
Sportspeople from Lower Saxony